Rio de Janeiro Vôlei Clube is a women's volleyball team, based in Rio de Janeiro, Rio de Janeiro (state), Brazil. Since the 2021-22 season the club plays under the name Sesc-RJ/Flamengo.

History
It was founded in 1997 as Paraná Vôlei Clube, playing in Curitiba, Paraná, and moved to Rio in 2003. They were previously known as Rexona-Ades, and since 2012 known as Unilever Vôlei, named after one of the sponsors.

Unilever Vôlei won the silver medal at the 2013 Club World Championship after falling 3-0 to Vakıfbank Istanbul.

In 2016, Sesc-RJ replaced Unilever's brand Ades as sponsor of the club changing its name to Rexona Sesc-RJ. Following the end of the 2016-17 season, Unilever withdrew its sponsorship completely, leaving Sesc as the sole sponsor of the team 

In 2020 the club merged previous rival CR Flamengo, and disputed the 2020-21 season under the name 'Sesc/Flamengo'.

Names evolution
 Rexona (as Paraná Vôlei Clube) (1997-2002)
 Rexona/Ades (2003-2009)
 Unilever Vôlei (2010-2013)
 Rexona/Ades (2014–2016)
 Rexona Sesc-RJ (2016-2017)
 Sesc RJ Vôlei (2017-2020)
 Sesc/Flamengo (2020-present)

Team
2020-2021 squad - As of October 2020
 Head coach:  Bernardo Rezende

Titles
 Brazilian Superliga:
  (x12) 1997–98, 1999–00, 2005–06, 2006–07, 2007–08, 2008–09, 2010–11, 2012–13, 2013–14, 2014-15, 2015-16, 2016–17
  (x5) 1998–99, 2004–05, 2009–10, 2011–12, 2017–18
 FIVB Club World Championship  (x2) 2013, 2017
 South American Club Championship
  (x4) 2013, 2015, 2016, 2017
  (x2) 2009, 2018
 Women's Top Volley International:
 Winners (2): 2006, 2009

References

External links

Brazilian volleyball clubs
Volleyball clubs established in 2005
2005 establishments in Brazil